{{Infobox settlement
| name                            = Enugu State
| official_name                   = 
| type                            = State
| image_skyline                   = Enugu panorama1.jpg
| image_alt                       = 
| image_caption                   = Enugu State
| image_flag                      = Enugu State Flag.svg
| flag_alt                        = Flag of Enugu
| image_seal                      = Enugu_state_Coat_of_Arms.jpg
| seal_alt                        = Seal of Enugu
| nicknames                       = Coal City State, Wawa State Igbo: Ọrā nke Ama ichekù
| image_map                       = Nigeria - Enugu.svg
| map_alt                         = 
| map_caption                     = Location of Enugu in Nigeria
| coordinates                     = 
| coor_pinpoint                   = 
| coordinates_footnotes           = 
| subdivision_type                = Country
| subdivision_name                = 
| established_title               = Date created
| established_date                = 27 August 1991
| seat_type                       = Capital
| seat                            = Enugu
| government_footnotes            = 

| governing_body                  = Government of Enugu State
| leader_party                    = PDP
| leader_title                    = Governor
| leader_name                     = Ifeanyi Ugwuanyi
| leader_title1                   = 
| leader_name1                    = Cecilia Ezeilo (PDP)
| leader_title2                   = Legislature
| leader_name2                    = Enugu State House of Assembly
| leader_title3                   = Senators
| leader_name3                    = 
| leader_title4                   = Representatives
| leader_name4                    = List
| unit_pref                       = Metric
| area_footnotes                  = 
| area_total_km2                  = 7161
| area_rank                       = 29 of 36
| area_note                       = 
| elevation_footnotes             = 
| elevation_m                     = 
| population_footnotes            = 
| population_total                = 3,267,837
| population_as_of                = 2006 Census
| population_est                  = 
| pop_est_as_of                   = 
| population_rank                 = 22 of 36
| population_density_km2          = Auto
| population_note                 = 
| timezone1                       = WAT
| utc_offset1                     = +01
| postal_code_type                = postal code
| postal_code                     = 400001
| area_code                       = +234
| area_code_type                  = Dialing Code
| iso_code                        = NG-EN
| blank_name_sec1                 = HDI (2018)
| blank_info_sec1                 = 0.634 · 10th of 37
| website                         = enugustate.gov.ng
| footnotes                       = 
| postal2_code                    = 
| native_name_lang                = igbo, igboid
}}
Enugu State is a state in the South-East geopolitical zone of Nigeria, bordered to the north by the states of Benue and Kogi, Ebonyi State to the east and southeast, Abia State to the south, and Anambra State to the west. The state takes its name from its capital and largest city, Enugu.

Of the 36 states, Enugu is the 29th largest in area and 22nd most populous with an estimated population of over 4.4 million as of 2016. Geographically, the state is divided between the Niger Delta swamp forests in the far south and the drier Guinean forest–savanna mosaic with some savanna in the rest of the state. Other important geographical features are the Udi-Nsukka Plateau and Ekulu River, which flows through the city of Enugu.

Modern-day Enugu State has been inhabited for years by various ethnic groups, primarily the Igbo people with minorities of Idoma and Igala peoples in Etteh Uno. In the pre-colonial period, what is now Enugu State was a part of the medieval Kingdom of Nri and the Arochukwu-based Aro Confederacy before the latter was defeated in the early 1900s by British troops in the Anglo-Aro War. After the war, the British incorporated the area into the Southern Nigeria Protectorate, which was later merged into British Nigeria in 1914; after the merger, Enugu became a symbol of anti-colonial resistance after the 1949 massacre of striking coal miners in the Iva Valley.

After independence in 1960, the area of what is now Enugu was a part of the post-independence Eastern Region until May 1967 when the region was split and the area became part of the East Central State. Less than two months afterwards, the former Eastern Region attempted to secede in the three-year long Nigerian Civil War with what is now Enugu State as a part of the secessionist state of Biafra. The city of Enugu was named the Biafran capital until October 1967 when it was captured by federal forces; the rest of the state was hard fought over but much of it fell by June 1968. At the war's end and the reunification of Nigeria, the East Central State was reformed until 1976 when Anambra State (including what is now Enugu) was formed by the Murtala Muhammed regime. Fifteen years afterwards, Anambra State was divided with the eastern part being broken off to form the new Enugu State; in 1996, part of Enugu State's east was removed to form a part of the new Ebonyi State. 

Economically, Enugu State is based around trading and services along with agriculture, mainly of yams, rice, cocoyam, oil palm, and cassava. A key minor industry was mining, especially of coal in the Udi Hills around the city of Enugu. Enugu State has the tenth highest Human Development Index in the country and is considered the heart of Igboland, the cultural region of ethnically Igbo areas.

 Geography 
Enugu State is one of the states in the eastern part of Nigeria located at the foot of the Udi Plateau. The state shares borders with Abia State and Imo State to the south, Ebonyi State to the east, Benue State to the northeast, Kogi State to the northwest and Anambra State to the west.

Enugu, the capital city of Enugu State, is on the railroad from Port Harcourt, 150 miles (240 km) south-southwest, and at the intersection of roads from Aba, Onitsha, and Abakaliki. It is approximately 4 driving hours away from Port Harcourt, where coal shipments exited Nigeria. Enugu is also located within an hour's drive from Onitsha, one of the biggest commercial cities in Africa and two hours' drive from Aba, another very large commercial city, both of which are trading centres in Nigeria. The average temperature in this city is cooler to mild ~17°C (60°F) in its cooler months and gets warmer to hot in its warmer months ~28°C (upper 80°F).

 History 
The name of the state was derived from its capital city, Enugu. The word "Enugu" (from Enu Ugwu'') means "the top of the hill". The first European settlers arrived in the area in 1909, led by a British mining engineer named Albert Kitson. In his quest for silver, he discovered coal in the Udi Ridge which is why the state is regarded as coal city state. The Colonial Governor of Nigeria Frederick Lugard took a keen interest in the discovery, and by 1914 the first shipment of coal was made to Britain. As mining activities increased in the area, a permanent cosmopolitan settlement emerged, supported by a railway system. Enugu acquired township status in 1917 and became strategic to British interests. Foreign businesses began to move into Enugu, the most notable of which were John Holt, Kingsway Stores, the British Bank of West Africa and the United Africa Company.

From Enugu, the British administration was able to spread its influence over the Southern Province of Nigeria. The colonial past of Enugu is today evidenced by the Georgian building types and meandering narrow roads within the residential area originally reserved for the whites, an area which is today called the Government Reserved Area (GRA).

From being the capital of the Southern Provinces, Enugu became the capital of the Eastern Region (now divided into nine States), the capital of the now defunct Federal Republic of Biafra, thereafter, the capital of East Central State, Anambra State, (old) Enugu State, and now the capital of the present Enugu State through a process of state creation and diffusion of administrative authority.

Politics 
The State Government and the Local Government are the two levels of government in Enugu State and in all other states of Nigeria. Ifeanyi Ugwuanyi is the current executive governor of Enugu State. He was elected by the people in April 2015 and was sworn in on 29 May 2015 and his vice is Cecilia Ezeilo. Sullivan Chime is the immediate past governor succeeding Chimaroke Nnamani. He was elected by the people of Enugu State in April 2007 and was sworn into office on 29 May 2007. The governor is above a group of commissioners who he has placed as heads of ministries that oversee various portfolios such as Health and Housing; both the governor and the commissioners form the Executive Council of Enugu State. Government House, Enugu is where the government of the state is based.

Electoral System

The electoral system of each state is selected using a modified two-round system. To be elected in the first round, a candidate must receive the plurality of the vote and over 25% of the vote in at least two -third of the State local government Areas. If no candidate passes threshold, a second round will be held between the top candidate and the next candidate to have received a plurality of votes in the highest number of local government areas.

Local Government Areas 

Enugu State consists of 17 Local Government Areas. They are:

 Aninri
 Awgu
 Enugu East
 Enugu North
 Enugu South
 Ezeagu
 Igbo Etiti
 Igbo Eze North
 Igbo Eze South
 Isi Uzo
 Nkanu East
 Nkanu West
 Nsukka
 Oji River
 Udenu
 Udi
 Uzo-Uwani

Economy
Economically, the state is predominantly rural and agrarian, with a substantial proportion of its working population engaged in farming, although trading (18.8%) and services (12.9%) are also important. In the urban areas trading is the dominant occupation, followed by services. A small proportion of the population is also engaged in manufacturing activities, with the most pronounced among them located in Enugu, Oji, Ohebedim and Nsukka. The state boasts of a number of markets especially at each of the divisional headquarters, prominent of which is the Ogbete Main market in the State capital, Enugu. There is also one of the largest grains market East of the Niger, the Orie Orba Market which plays host to most farmers from the North Central States of Benue, Kogi, Nassarawa and Plateau who use the market to dispose their produce for consumers in South-East and South-Southern Nigeria . Every four days, grains and other farm produce are found in large quantities and at highly competitive prices.

Natural Resources in Enugu State
The following Natural Resources are found in Enugu State:
 Coal
 Lead
 Zinc
 Limestone

Energy
Electricity supply is relatively stable in Enugu and its environs. The Oji River Power Station (which used to supply electricity to all of Eastern Nigeria) is located in Enugu State. With the deregulation of electricity generation in Nigeria and the privatisation of the Power Holding Company of Nigeria (PHCN), it is hoped the State Government would assist private investors to negotiate the take over and reactivation of the Oji Power Station. This is more so with the proximity of the Enugu coal mines to the power station, a driving distance of about 20 minutes. There are also traces of crude oil in Ugwuoba, in the same Oji-River Local Government area of the state. The state will also negotiate with investors interested in investing in the coal mining in Enugu.  The coal industry used to be one of the biggest employer of labour in the state and the state is looking to attract investors in the industry.

Education
Every community in Enugu State has at least one Primary/Elementary school and one Secondary school, funded and run by State Government. There are also large numbers of private nursery, primary and secondary schools in Enugu State.

Nigeria's first indigenous university, (University of Nigeria, Nsukka (UNN)), is located in Enugu State. The state also hosts the Enugu State University of Science & Technology (ESUT), Institute of Management and Technology (IMT), Federal Cooperative College, Oji River (FCCO); Enugu State College of Education Technical, Enugu; Caritas University, Amorji-Nike, Renaissance University, Ugbawka; Command Day Secondary School Enugu, Federal Government College Enugu, Federal School of Dental Technology & Therapy, College of Immaculate Conception, Enugu, Queen's School Enugu a Prominent high school for girls in the Eastern region; St. Theresa's College, Nsukka; Special Science Boys' Secondary School Agbani, Nkanu West L.G.A; [St. Patrick's Secondary School], Emene, Bigard Memorial Seminary, Enugu; Awgu County College, Nenwe; Community Secondary School, Ugbo-Okpala, Ugbo; Corpus Christi College, Achi, Royal Crown Academy, Nsukka, Enugu State, Enugu]; Our Saviour Institute of Science and Technology, Enugu; and the Federal College of Education, Eha-Amufu, Seat of Wisdom Secondary School Trans Ekulu Enugu, Osisatech boys secondary school. There are also a host of private computer schools and training centres concentrated in Enugu and Nsukka. There are also notable private Tertiary Institutions in Enugu such as Caritas University, a Catholic university founded by a Catholic Priest: Father Edeh, and Renaissance University.

Healthcare
The University of Nigeria Teaching Hospital (UNTH) is located in Enugu State, as is the Enugu State University Teaching Hospital and College of Medicine, which is located in the capital city, Enugu. In addition to numerous private hospitals and clinics in the state, there are seven District Hospitals at Enugu –Urban, Udi, Agbani, Awgu, Ikem, Enugu-Ezike, and Nsukka – and at least one health centre or cottage hospital in every one of the 17 Local Government Areas and 39 Development Centres in the state. The University of Nigeria Veterinary Teaching Hospital (VTH) is also located in Enugu.

Among the notable Medical Institutions in Enugu are Niger Foundation Hospital and Enugu State University Teaching Hospital (Popularly known as Park Lane)

Religion Practiced in Enugu State
The dominant religion in Enugu State is Christianity, Although few practiced Islam and traditional worship.

Church 
The churches in Enugu State include Catholic, Anglican and other Pentecostal churches both Orthodox and unorthodox. The Catholic Cathedral is Holy Ghost Cathedral located close to Ogbete Main Market. The Anglican Cathedral is Cathedral Church of Good Shepherd located at 11 Achi St, Independence Layout. 

Enugu State also has numerous Pentecostal churches like Assemblies of God Church, Redeemed Christian Church of God,  House on the Rock, Dominion City, Dunamis, WInners, Christ Embassy, etc.

Demographics 
Enugu State had a population of 3,267,837 people at the census held in 2006 (estimated at over 3.8 million in 2012). It is home of the Igbo of southeastern and few Idoma/Igala people in Ette (Igbo-Eze North) of Enugu State, Nigeria.

Notable people 

 Rear admiral Allison Madueke - Former Chief Naval Staff
 Justice Anthony Aniagolu
 Commodore Anthony Ogugua - Military Governor of Imo state
 Justice Augustine Nnamani
 Sen Ayogu Eze
 Prof. Barth Nnaji  - Former Minister of Power
 Bianca Ojukwu Nee (Onoh)
 Lolo Cecelia  Ezeilo - The first female Deputy Governor of Enugu State.
 Justice Charles Onyeama - Justice of the Supreme Court of Nigeria, and International Court of Justice
 Senator Chimaroke Nnamani - Ex Governor Enugu State
 Chiwetel Ejiofor - British Actor
 Christian Chukwu -  Ex super eagles captain and coach
 Chief C.C. Onoh - Governor Old Anambra, First Indigenous Chairman Coal Co-operation
 Prof Onwumechili Cyril - The first Nigerian Nuclear Physicist and First African Professor of Agricultural Science
 Daniel Kanayo Daniel
 Dillibe Onyeama  - Nigerian Author and publisher, the first black person to finish his studies at Eton College
 Akuabata Njeze - Former Minister of Aviation and Ambassador
 Frank Edward
 Frank Nweke - Former Minister and DG Nigerian Economics Summit Group
 Geofrey Onyema - Minister of Foreign Affairs
 Ifeanyi Ugwuanyi - Governor Enugu state, Former Three times member House of Representative
 Senator Ike Ekweremadu - Longest Serving Deputy Senate President in Nigeria and First Nigerian Speaker of ECOWAS Parliament
 Commodore James Aneke - Military Governor of Imo state
 Jim Ifeanyichukwu Nwobodo - Ex Governor Old Anambra state, Minister and Senator
 John Nnia Nwodo - President Ohaneze Ndigbo and Former Minister of Information
 John Okafor (Aka Mr. Ibu)
 Group Capt. Joe Orji - Military Governor Gombe state
 Justina Eze - Ambassador
 Senator Ken Nnamani - Former Senate President
 Kenneth Okonkwo
 Mike Ejeagha
 Nkem Owoh
 Ogbonna Onovo - I.G.P
 Ogonna Nneka Nnamani - American indoor volleyball player, former member of the United States National and Olympic Team
 Dr. Okwesilieze Nwodo - Governor Old Enugu State and Former National Secretary PDP
 Prof. Chinedu Nebo  - Former V.C. University of Nigeria Nsukka and Federal University Oye Ekiti, Former Minister of Power
 Prof Osita Ogbu
 Patience Ozokwor
 Justice Nnaemeka Agu 
 Racheal Okonkwo
 Sullivan Chime - Former Governor Enugu State
 Uche Ogbodo
 William Onyeabor
 Zain Ejiofor Asher - British News Anchor at CNN
 Owoh Chimaobi Chris (Aka Zoro)
Hazel Oyeye Onou (Aka White-Money) Winner of Big Brother Naija season 6 (Shine Ya Eye)

Religion 
A significant portion of the people of Enugu adhere to Christianity with small groups adhering to African traditional religion known as Omenani, or are irreligious or atheist. There are little number of Hausa people and Yoruba people, who came for business.

See also
Owo
Ohum
Oji River
Nsukka
Igbo Eze South
Umualor

References

External links 
State government website
Insight into Enugu, Igbo Culture and Language

 
States of Nigeria
States in Igboland
States and territories established in 1991
1991 establishments in Nigeria